Homer Eon Flint (born as Homer Eon Flindt; 1888  –1924) was an American writer of pulp science fiction novels and short stories.

He began working as a scenarist for silent films in 1912 (reportedly at his wife's insistence). In 1918, he published "The Planeteer" in All-Story Weekly. His "Dr. Kinney" stories were reprinted by Ace Books in 1965, and with Austin Hall he co-wrote the novel The Blind Spot.

He died in 1924 under mysterious circumstances, his body found at the bottom of a canyon underneath a stolen taxi. 

His son was Max Hugh Flindt (1915–2004), the co-founder of The Ancient Astronaut Society. With Otto Binder, he co-authored Mankind – Child of the Stars in 1974.  He also had a daughter, Bonnie Palmer.

Works
(from the Internet Speculative Fiction Database)

Novels

 The Blind Spot (1921) with Austin Hall

Story collections

 The Lord of Death and The Queen of Life (1965)
 The Devolutionist and The Emancipatrix (1965)
 The Interplanetary Adventures of Dr. Kinney (2008)

Serials

 Out of the Moon (1924)
  
Short fiction

 "The Planeteer" (1918)
 "The King of Conserve Island" (1918)
 "The Man in the Moon" (1919)
 "The Lord of Death" (1919)
 "The Queen of Life" (1919)
 "The Greater Miracle" (1920)
 "The Devolutionist" (1921)
 "The Emancipatrix" (1921)
 "The Nth Man" (1928), adapted in 1957 as the AIP feature film  The Amazing Colossal Man

Career Retrospective
 The 26th Golden Age of Science Fiction Megapack: Homer Eon Flint, edited, annotated & introduced, with individual story introductions and much biographical content and unpublished fiction, by Vella Munn, (Wildside Press 2015, omnibus, ebook) - over 500,000 words of fiction
A Note from the Publisher, John Gregory Betancourt, (in) *
Excerpt: "Decades later his oldest granddaughter, Vella Munn, has penned introductions to his unpublished short stories and added photographs and memories of the young author’s life. She has also written a biography of his life—the story of his passions, intellect, and creativity. It’s also a search for the truth behind his violent end."
Grandfather Lost: The Story of Homer Eon Flint, Vella Munn, (ar) * - 38300 words; biography, basically a book in its own right, with copious letters and black-and-white photographs.
"The Planetary Pirate," (nv) *
"The Planeteer," (na) All-Story Weekly March 09 1918 - 38300 words
"The Man in the Moon," (nv) All-Story Weekly Oct. 04 1919
"The Nth Man," (na) Amazing Stories Quarterly Spring 1928 - 37200 words
The Blind Spot (with Austin Hall), (n) Argosy All-Story Weekly May 14 1921 (+5) / Prime Press 1951 - 105500 words, read online at Project Gutenberg
The Devolutionist & The Emancipatrix, Ace 1965 (c, pb) - 66000 words, read online at Project Gutenberg
"The Devolutionist," (na) Argosy All-Story Weekly July 23 1921
"The Emancipatrix," (na) Argosy All-Story Weekly Sep. 03 1921
"The Greater Miracle," (ss) All-Story Weekly April 24 1920
The Lord of Death & The Queen of Life, Ace 1965 (c, pb) - 47300 words, read online at Project Gutenberg
"The Lord of Death," (na) All-Story Weekly May 10 1919
"The Queen of Life," (na) All-Story Weekly Aug. 16 1919
Unpublished fiction:
"Buy a Liberty Bomb!" (ss) *
"The Flying Bloodhound," (ss) * 
"Golden Web Claim," (nv) *
"Luck," (ss) *
"The Stain in the Table," (ss) *
Steal Me If You Can, (novel) * - 61200 words
"No Fool," (ss) *
"The Breaker Mends," (ss) *
"The Man Who Took Paris," (ss) *
"The Perfect Curiosity," (ss) *
"The Peacock Vest," (ss) *
The Missing Mondays, (novel) Argosy Allstory Weekly Jan. 20 1923 (+1) - 41200 words 
The Money-Miler, (novel) Flynn's Weekly Oct. 04 1924 (+2) - 48800 words

References

External links

 
 
 

20th-century American novelists
American male novelists
American science fiction writers
1888 births
1924 deaths
American male short story writers
20th-century American short story writers
20th-century American male writers